WE LIVE IN PUBLIC is a 2009 documentary film by Ondi Timoner, which profiles Internet pioneer Josh Harris. Its theme is the loss of privacy in the Internet age.

Synopsis 
The film details the experiences of "the greatest Internet pioneer you've never heard of," Josh Harris. The dot-com millionaire founded Pseudo.com, the first Internet television network during the infamous tech boom of the late '90s. After achieving prominence amongst the Silicon Alley set, Harris became interested in controversial human experiments which tested the effects of media and technology on the development of personal identity. Ondi Timoner documented the major business-related moments of Harris' life for more than a decade, setting the tone for her documentary of the virtual world and its supposed control of human lives.

Among Harris' experiments touched on in the film is the art project "Quiet: We Live in Public," an Orwellian, Big Brother concept developed in the late '90s which placed more than 100 artists in a human terrarium under New York City, with myriad webcams following and capturing every move the artists made. The pièce de résistance was a Japanese-style capsule hotel outfitted with cameras in every pod, and screens that allowed each occupant to monitor the other pods installed in the basement by artist Jeff Gompertz, co-founder of the media art group Fakeshop.

The film's website describes how, "With Quiet, Harris proved how, in the not-so-distant future of life online, we will willingly trade our privacy for the connection and recognition we all deeply desire. Through his experiments, including another six-month stint living under 24-hour live surveillance online which led him to mental collapse, he demonstrated the price we will all pay for living in public."

"He climbs into the TV set and he becomes the rat in his own experiment at this point, and the results don't turn out very well for him," says Timoner of the six-month period Harris broadcast live, online his life in his NYC loft. "He really takes the only relationship that he's ever had that was close and intimate and beaches it on 30 motion-controlled surveillance cameras and 66 invasive microphones. I mean his girlfriend who signed on to it thinking it would be fun and cool, and that they were living a fast and crazy Internet life, she ended up leaving him. She just couldn't be intimate in public. And I think that's an important lesson; the Internet, as wonderful as it is, is not an intimate medium. It's just not. If you want to keep something intimate and if you want to keep something sacred, you probably shouldn't post it."

The film includes commentary from Internet personalities Chris DeWolfe, Jason Calacanis, Douglas Rushkoff, and venture capitalist Fred Wilson, as well as artists and producers involved in the "Quiet: We Live in Public" event V. Owen Bush, Jeff Gompertz, Leo Fernekes, Feedbuck, Leo Koenig, Gabriella Latessa, Alex Arcadia, Zeroboy, Alfredo Martinez, and others.

Awards 
We Live in Public was screened six times at the 2009 Sundance Film Festival before being awarded the Grand Jury Prize award in the U.S. documentary category.  Timoner is the first director in the Sundance Film Festival's history to win the Grand Jury Prize award twice. Her first win was for the widely acclaimed documentary, Dig! (2004).

We Live In Public was also the runner-up for Best Documentary at the 2009 Karlovy Vary International Film Festival.

Critical response 
On Rotten Tomatoes, the film has an 82% approval rating, based on 51 reviews. The critics consensus says, "This documentary about Josh Harris' surveillance-as-art project exposes the problems of privacy in the internet age and asks provocative questions about the power of ego in a place where everything is on display." Roger Ebert gave the film four stars, his highest rating, and wrote, "This is a remarkable film about a strange and prophetic man."

References

External links 
  expired on 11/25/2020
 
 
 
 

2009 films
2009 documentary films
American documentary films
Sundance Film Festival award winners
Documentary films about computer and internet entrepreneurs
Films directed by Ondi Timoner
Documentary films about the Internet
2000s English-language films
2000s American films
English-language documentary films